Cement is a socialist realism novel by Fyodor Gladkov (1883–1958). Published in 1925, the book is arguably the first in Soviet socialist realist literature to depict the struggles of post-Revolutionary reconstruction. 

The protagonist, Gleb Chumalov, is a returning Red Army soldier who, after the Russian Civil War, comes back to a hometown in painful transition and to its cement factory being reorganized for the massive new Soviet effort. His wife, Dasha, plays the role of the Soviet "new woman", and Gleb finds he cannot easily pick up the threads of their old relationship. The novel is Gladkov's best known work because of its portrayal of the sociological effects of early Communism, especially after the sexes are suddenly decreed equal in the labor force of the local cement factory.

References

1925 Russian novels
Novels set in Russia
Socrealist novels